Laramie County is a county located at the southeast corner of the state of Wyoming. As of the 2020 United States Census, the population was 100,512 or 17.4% of the state's total 2020 population, making it the most populous county in Wyoming, but the least populous county in the United States to be the most populous in its state. 

The county seat is Cheyenne, the state capital. The county lies west of the Nebraska state line and north of the Colorado state line.

Laramie County comprises the Cheyenne, WY Metropolitan Statistical Area.

The city of Laramie, Wyoming, is in neighboring Albany County.

History
Laramie County was originally created in 1867 as a county within the Dakota Territory. The county was named for Jacques La Ramee, a French-Canadian fur-trader. In 1867, a portion of Laramie County was annexed to create Sweetwater County; in 1868; further annexations occurred to create Albany County and Carbon County. Laramie County became a county in the Wyoming Territory when the territorial government was formed in 1869. Crook County was created with land ceded by Laramie County in 1875. In 1888, Converse County was formed from a portion of Laramie County. In 1911, Goshen and Platte Counties were formed from parts of Laramie County, giving the county its current boundaries.

The county's early economy was based on agriculture and livestock raising. The present-day Wyoming Stock Growers Association dates from that era. Other types of animal husbandry also occurred.

Some of the settlers in early Laramie County were foreign immigrants; for example, Burns was largely settled by German immigrants.

Arts and Culture

Laramie County Library System 
The Laramie County Library System is one of the oldest continually operating county library systems in the United States, the first branch established in Cheyenne in 1886. In 1899, Andrew Carnegie donated $50,000 toward the building of the state's first Carnegie Public Library, which opened in 1902. The library moved to a larger location in 1969. In 2007, a second library opened.

Geography

Adjacent counties

 Goshen County – north
 Banner County, Nebraska – northeast
 Kimball County, Nebraska – east
 Weld County, Colorado – south 
 Larimer County, Colorado – southwest
 Albany County – west
 Platte County – northwest

Major highways 
  Interstate 25
  Interstate 80
  Interstate 180 (Not a freeway.)

  U.S. Highway 30
  U.S. Highway 85
  U.S. Highway 87
  Wyoming Highway 210
  Wyoming Highway 211
  Wyoming Highway 212
  Wyoming Highway 213
  Wyoming Highway 214
  Wyoming Highway 215
  Wyoming Highway 216
  Wyoming Highway 219
  Wyoming Highway 221
  Wyoming Highway 222
  Wyoming Highway 223
  Wyoming Highway 225

Demographics

2000 census
As of the 2000 United States Census, Laramie County had 81,607 people, 31,927 households, and 21,614 families. The population density was 30 people per square mile (12/km2). The county had 34,213 housing units at an average density of 13 per square mile (5/km2). The racial makeup of the county was 88.92% White, 2.60% Black or African American, 0.85% Native American, 0.95% Asian, 0.11% Pacific Islander, 4.00% from other races, and 2.57% from two or more races. 10.90% of the population were Hispanic or Latino of any race. 23.7% were of German, 11.1% English, 10.3% Irish and 7.4% American ancestry.

As of the 2000 census, Laramie County had 31,927 households, of which 33.20% had children under the age of 18 living with them, 53.90% were married couples living together, 9.90% had a female householder with no husband present, and 32.30% were non-families. 27.20% of all households were made up of a single individual and 8.90% had someone living alone who was 65 years of age or older. The average household size was 2.45 and the average family size was 2.98.

The county population contained 25.80% under the age of 18, 9.60% from 18 to 24, 30.50% from 25 to 44, 22.70% from 45 to 64, and 11.50% who were 65 years of age or older. The median age was 35 years. For every 100 females, the county had 100-100.9 males.

The median income for a household in the county was $39,607, and the median income for a family was $46,536. Males had a median income of $31,644 versus $24,406 for females. The per capita income for the county was $19,634. About 6.50% of families and 9.10% of the population were below the poverty line, including 12.00% of those under age 18 and 6.50% of those age 65 or over.

2010 census
As of the 2010 United States Census, there were 91,738 people, 37,576 households, and 24,340 families in the county. The racial makeup of the county was 88.5% white, 2.5% black or African American, 1.1% Asian, 1.0% American Indian, 0.2% Pacific islander, 3.8% from other races, and 3.1% from two or more races. Those of Hispanic or Latino origin made up 13.1% of the population. In terms of ancestry, 29.5% were German, 15.5% were Irish, 12.7% were English, and 4.9% were American.

Of the 37,576 households, 31.9% had children under the age of 18 living with them, 49.3% were married couples living together, 10.7% had a female householder with no husband present, 35.2% were non-families, and 29.1% of all households were made up of individuals. The average household size was 2.40 and the average family size was 2.95. The median age was 37.0 years.

The median income for a household in the county was $52,824 and the median income for a family was $64,589. Males had a median income of $44,001 versus $32,882 for females. The per capita income for the county was $27,406. About 6.7% of families and 9.6% of the population were below the poverty line, including 13.8% of those under age 18 and 4.0% of those age 65 or over.

Communities

City
 Cheyenne (county seat)

Towns
 Albin
 Burns
 Pine Bluffs

Census-designated places

 Carpenter
 Fox Farm-College
 Hillsdale
 Ranchettes
 South Greeley
 FE Warren AFB

Unincorporated communities

 Altvan
 Egbert
 Granite
 Horse Creek
 Meriden

Politics and government
Like Wyoming as a whole, Laramie County is strongly Republican. It is extremely conservative for an urban county, having not backed the Democratic presidential candidate since Lyndon Johnson in 1964–one of only two times since 1952 that it has supported a Democrat. In 2016, Hillary Clinton managed to win just 28.3 percent of the vote in the county, the lowest total of any presidential candidate in Laramie since John W. Davis in 1924, when a large proportion of liberal voters defected to Robert M. La Follette, Sr. Nonetheless, the county is the third-friendliest to Democrats in the state, beaten only by Teton County and Albany County.

See also
Wyoming
List of cities and towns in Wyoming
List of counties in Wyoming
Wyoming statistical areas
Cheyenne County, Jefferson Territory
Front Range Urban Corridor
National Register of Historic Places listings in Laramie County, Wyoming
Southern Rocky Mountain Front

References

Further reading
Hallberg, L.L. and J.P. Mason. (2007). Selected hydrogeologic data for the High Plains aquifer in southwestern Laramie County WY, 1931-2006 [US Geological Survey Open-File Report 2007-1069]. Reston VA: US Dept of the Interior, US Geological Survey.

External links

Laramie County website

 
1867 establishments in Dakota Territory
Populated places established in 1867